Smarhon or Smorgon is a city in the Grodno Region of Belarus.  It was the site of Smarhon air base, now mostly abandoned. Smarhoń is located 107 km from the capital, Minsk.

History
[[File:Smarhoń. Смаргонь (C. Faber du Faur, 3.12.1812).jpg|left|thumb|Grande Armée'''s remnant passing through the town]]
Within the Grand Duchy of Lithuania, Smarhon was part of Vilnius Voivodeship. In 1795, the town was acquired by the Russian Empire in the course of the Third Partition of Poland. Until the mid 19th century, Smarhon was a private property of the Radziwiłł family with most of its population being Jewish.

From 1921 until 1939, Smarhon (Smorgonie) was part of the Second Polish Republic. In September 1939, the town was occupied by the Red Army and, on 14 November 1939, incorporated into the Byelorussian SSR.

From 25 June 1941 until 4 July 1944, Smarhon was occupied by Nazi Germany and administered as a part of the Generalbezirk Litauen of Reichskommissariat Ostland.

Smorgon is known as the place where a school of bear training, the so-called "Bear Academy", was founded.

 Smarhon baranki 
Up until World War II, Smarhon was widely known for its baranki, traditional Eastern European ring-shaped bread rolls, similar to bagels and bubliki. Russian food historian William Pokhlyobkin considered Smarhon to be the birthplace of baranki. Baranki were supposedly used to feed bears in the Bear Academy. Written accounts of Smarhon baranki appeared in the 19th century. Polish-Lithuanian journalist Adam Kirkor wrote in the encyclopedia Picturesque Russia: "In Smorgon, Oshmyany district, Vilna province, almost all the petty bourgeois population is busy baking small , or kringles, which are widely known as Smorgon obvaranki''. Each traveller would definitely buy several bundles of these ; besides, they are transported to Vilna and other cities." Władysław Syrokomla mentioned Smarhon as "the capital of obwarzanki famous in all Lithuania". Smarhon obwarzanki were a traditional treat at Saint Casimir's Fair in Vilnius.

International relations
Smarhon is twinned with:

  Visaginas, Lithuania
  Alytus, Lithuania
  Krasnoznamensk, Russia

Famous natives and citizens of Smarhon
 Zmicier Apanasovič (nom de guerre “Terror") (1990–2022), Belarusian volunteer killed in action defending Ukraine during the 2022 Russian invasion
 Peter Blume (1906–1992), US painter, in magic realism style
 Louis Hurwich (1886–1967), US Jewish educator, superintendent of the Boston Bureau of Jewish Education and founder of Hebrew College
 Isaac Itkind (1871–1969), distinguished Russian and Soviet sculptor
 Abraham Isaac Kook (1865–1935), rabbi, Jewish theologist, Ashkenazi chief rabbi of Palestine, learned in Smarhon Yeshiva
 Moyshe Kulbak (1896–1937), Belarusian Yiddish poet, writer, executed by the NKVD
 Moshe Kussevitzki (1899–1966), Polish-US Jewish cantor
 Ida Lazarovich Gilman or Ida Mett (1901–1973), Russian anarchist militant and author, exiled in France
 Shalom Levin (1916–1995), Secretary Gen. and President of Israel Teachers Union, Knesset (Parliament) Member, educator and author
 Karol Dominik Przezdziecki (1782–1832), Polish count, fighter for the liberation of Poland in the revolt of 1830–1831
 David Raziel (1910–1941), fighter for the emancipation of Jews in Palestine, commander of the Irgun Tzvai Leumi nationalist resistance organization, killed in Iraq on an anti-Nazi mission
 Esther Raziel Naor (1911–2002), Israeli politician, militant in the Irgun Jewish nationalist resistance during the British mandate in Palestine
 William Schwartz (1896–1977), US painter
 Nahum Slouschz (1872–1966), Israeli writer, translator and archaeologist
 Abraham Sutzkever (1913–2010), Yiddish and Polish poet and Second World War partisan
The Gordin brothers, Abba (1887–1964) and Wolf, anarchist educators, militants, and theorists

References and notes

External links

 Smorgon memory book
 Photos on Radzima.org
 

 
Cities in Belarus
Oshmyansky Uyezd
Populated places in Grodno Region
Shtetls
Smarhon District
Vilnius Voivodeship
Wilno Voivodeship (1926–1939)